Moorang is a rural locality in the Scenic Rim Region, Queensland, Australia.

Geography 

The Little Liverpool Range forms the western boundary of the locality. There are two named peaks in the range within Moorang:

 Grass Tree Knob 

 Kangaroo Mountain 
The Bremer River rises in Tarome to the south and flows through the locality exiting to the north (Rosevale).

History
Moorang is an Aboriginal word meaning duck.

Moorang Provisional School opened on 29 January 1894 on a  site donated by James English junior in 1891. On 1 January 1909 it became Moorang State School. It  closed in 1913 but re-opened in 1914 before permanently closing on 13 December 1920. All buildings were removed from the site and in December 1985 the Queensland Government decided to sell the site. It was on the southern side of Logan Lane (approx ).

The average weekly household income is $1,343, $95 below the national average.

Education 
There are no schools in Moorang. The nearest government primary schools are Warrill View State School in Warrill View to the north-east and Aratula State School in Aratula to the south-east. The nearest government secondary schools are Rosewood State High School in Rosewood to the north-east  and Boonah State High School in Boonah to the south-east.

References

Scenic Rim Region
Localities in Queensland